Bimo may refer to:

Bimbo, Central African Republic
Bimo, a shaman of the Yi people

See also
 BIMOS, Busan Motor Show
 BiMOS, MOS-based BJT